John Dunbar Rusher (born April 18, 1967 in Boston, Massachusetts) is an American rower.  He graduated from Harvard University in 1989.

References

External links
 
 

1967 births
Living people
American male rowers
Rowers from Boston
Rowers at the 1988 Summer Olympics
Rowers at the 1992 Summer Olympics
Olympic bronze medalists for the United States in rowing
World Rowing Championships medalists for the United States
Medalists at the 1988 Summer Olympics
Harvard University alumni